Joseph Rose Tozer (1881 in Birmingham, Warwickshire – 1955) was a British actor.

Musical theatre
Houp La! (1916)

Partial filmography
 The Brass Bottle (1914)
 A Park Lane Scandal (1915)
 The Answer (1916)
 The Merchant of Venice (1916)
 Burnt Wings (1916)
 Bars of Iron (1920)
 The Old Wives' Tale (1921)
 Gwyneth of the Welsh Hills (1921)
 The Scourge (1922)
 The Sporting Instinct (1922)
 The Pointing Finger (1922)
 The Greek Interpreter (1922)
 Diana of the Crossways (1922)
 The Passionate Adventure (1924)
 Zero (1928)
 Afterwards (1928)
 Cardinal Richelieu (1935)
 Clive of India (1935)
 Anna Karenina (1935)
 The Lady Escapes (1937)

References

External links

1881 births
1955 deaths
English male film actors
English male silent film actors
People from Birmingham, West Midlands
20th-century English male actors